The 2011 FIM Fogo European Speedway Grand Prix was the first race of the 2011 Speedway Grand Prix season. It take place on April 30 at the Alfred Smoczyk Stadium in Leszno, Poland.

It was fourth SGP event held in Leszno. Grand Prix was won by Dane Nicki Pedersen who beat defending World Champion Pole Tomasz Gollob, Russian Emil Sayfutdinov and Vice-Champion Jarosław Hampel from Poland. Gollob, scoring 18 points, becoming Championship leader.

Riders 
The Speedway Grand Prix Commission nominated Damian Baliński as Wild Card, and Patryk Dudek and Maciej Janowski both as Track Reserves. The Draw was made on April 29 by Tomasz Malepszy, President (=Mayor) of Leszno. Hampel, Kołodziej and Baliński are ridding for Unia Leszno in the 2011 Speedway Ekstraliga.

Heat details

Heat after heat 
 (61,65) Gollob, Holder, Lindgren, Harris
 (61,50 or 61,60) Kołodziej, Holta, Pedersen, Jonsson
 (60,91) Sayfutdinov, Hancock, Hampel, Bjerre (Fx)
 (61,45) Crump, Baliński, Lindbäck, Laguta
 (61,03) Hancock, Crump, Holder, Kołodziej
 (61,44) Sayfutdinov, Pedersen, Baliński, Gollob (Fx)
 (61,09) Lindgren, Jonsson, Hampel, Lindbäck
 (61,91) Bjerre, Holta, Harris, Laguta
 (61,65) Pedersen, Holder, Hampel, Laguta
 (61,85) Gollob, Kołodziej, Bjerre, Lindbäck
 (61,88) Hancock, Lindgren, Holta, Baliński
 (62,49) Harris, Sayfutdinov, Jonsson, Crump
 (62,51) Bjerre, Holder, Jonsson, Baliński (Fx)
 (61,87) Hampel, Gollob, Holta, Crump
 (62,42) Kołodziej, Lindgren, Sayfutdinov, Laguta
 (62,43) Hancock, Pedersen, Harris, Lindbäck
 (62,55) Holta, Holder, Sayfutdinov, Lindbäck
 (62,23) Gollob, Hancock, Jonsson, Laguta
 (63,16) Lindgren, Bjerre, Pedersen, Crump
 (63,27) Hampel, Harris, Baliński, Kołodziej (Fx)
 Semi-Finals:
 (62,78) Hampel, Sayfutdinov, Hancock, Holta
 (62,58) Gollob, Pedersen, Bjerre, Lindgren (Fx)
 the Final:
 (63,07) Pedersen, Gollob, Sayfutdinov, Hampel

The intermediate classification

See also 
 motorcycle speedway

References 

Speedway Grand Prix of Europe
Europe
2011
Sport in Greater Poland Voivodeship
Leszno